Idrottspark or Idrottsparken may refer to:

Ljusdals Idrottspark
Motala Idrottspark
Norrköpings Idrottspark
Sundsvalls Idrottspark
Sävstaås Idrottspark